Claus Jacobi (4 January 1927 – 17 August 2013) was the editor of the German news magazine Der Spiegel from 1962–1968. He was arrested during the Spiegel scandal.

Jacobi was born and died in Hamburg. In 1946, he started his journalistic career. His wife Heidi (they married in 1971) unexpectedly died on 21 February 2012 in her sleep.

Works (excerpt) 
 Die menschliche Springflut, 1969 (~ The population explosion of mankind) 
 Uns bleiben 100 Jahre. Ursachen und Auswirkungen der Bevölkerungsexplosion, 1986,  (~ We still have 100 years. Reasons for and effects of the population explosion) 
 Fremde, Freunde, Feinde. Eine private Zeitgeschichte, 1991, 
 Aufbruch zwischen Elbe und Oder. Die neuen deutschen Länder, 1995,  (~ start-up between Elbe and Oder. The new German Bundesländer) 
 50 Jahre Axel-Springer-Verlag. 1946–1996, 1996
 Der Schokoladenkönig. Das unglaubliche Leben des Hans Imhoff, 1997,  
 Unsere fünfzig Jahre. Erinnerungen eines Zeitzeugen, 1999, 
 Im Rad der Geschichte. Deutsche Verhältnisse, 2002,  
 Der Verleger Axel Springer. Eine Biographie aus der Nähe, 2005,

References

1927 births
2013 deaths
German military personnel of World War II
Journalists from Hamburg
German male journalists
German business and financial journalists
20th-century German journalists
21st-century German journalists
German male writers
Der Spiegel editors
Die Welt editors
Welt am Sonntag editors
Wirtschaftswoche editors